Michael Shapiro may refer to:

 Michael Shapiro (actor), American actor, voice actor and theatre director
 Mike Shapiro (programmer), American computer programmer
 Michael J. Shapiro (born 1940), American political scientist at the University of Hawai'i
 Michael Jeffrey Shapiro, American composer and music director of the Chappaqua Orchestra
 Mike Shapiro, bookmaker, see Sands Hotel and Casino

See also
 Mikhail Chapiro (born 1938), Russian artist and painter, currently lives in Canada